Luca Capecchi (born 4 August 1974 in Imola, Italy) is an Italian footballer, currently playing as a goalkeeper for Fondi Calcio.

Capecchi has played for Baracca Lugo, A.S. Cittadella, Pisa Calcio, A.S. Sora and Ravenna Calcio. In January 2008, he joined Cagliari Calcio on loan until June.

References

1974 births
Living people
People from Imola
Italian footballers
Association football goalkeepers
Pisa S.C. players
Ravenna F.C. players
Cagliari Calcio players
Serie A players
A.S. Cittadella players
Footballers from Emilia-Romagna
Sportspeople from the Metropolitan City of Bologna